Scott Elliott Fahlman (born March 21, 1948) is a computer scientist and Professor Emeritus at Carnegie Mellon University's Language Technologies Institute and Computer Science Department.  He is notable for early work on automated planning and scheduling in a blocks world, on semantic networks, on neural networks (especially the cascade correlation algorithm), on the programming languages Dylan, and Common Lisp (especially CMU Common Lisp), and he was one of the founders of Lucid Inc. During the period when it was standardized, he was recognized as "the leader of Common Lisp." From 2006 to 2015, Fahlman was engaged in developing a knowledge base named Scone, based in part on his thesis work on the NETL Semantic Network. He also is credited with coining the use of the emoticon :-).

Life and career
Fahlman was born in Medina, Ohio, the son of Lorna May (Dean) and John Emil Fahlman. He attended the Massachusetts Institute of Technology (MIT), where he received a Bachelor of Science (B.S.) and Master of Science (M.S.) degree in electrical engineering and computer science in 1973, and a Doctor of Philosophy (Ph.D.) in artificial intelligence in 1977. His master's thesis advisor was Patrick Winston and his doctoral thesis advisor was Gerald Sussman. He has noted that his doctoral diploma says the degree was awarded for "original research as demonstrated by a thesis in the field of Artificial Intelligence" and suggested that it may be the first doctorate to use that term. He is a fellow of the American Association for Artificial Intelligence.

Fahlman acted as thesis advisor for Donald Cohen, David B. McDonald, David S. Touretzky, Skef , Justin Boyan, Michael Witbrock, and Alicia Tribble Sagae.

From May 1996 to July 2001, Fahlman directed the Justsystem Pittsburgh Research Center.

Emoticons
Fahlman was not the first to suggest the concept of the emoticon – a similar concept for a marker appeared in an article of Reader's Digest in May 1967, although that idea was never put into practice.

In an interview printed in The New York Times in 1969, Vladimir Nabokov noted: "I often think there should exist a special typographical sign for a smile –
 some sort of concave mark, a supine round bracket."

Fahlman is credited with originating the first smiley emoticon, which he thought would help people on a message board at Carnegie Mellon to distinguish serious posts from jokes. He proposed the use of :-) and :-( for this purpose, and the symbols caught on. The original message from which these symbols originated was posted on 19 September 1982. The message was recovered by Jeff Baird on 10 September 2002 and read:

19-Sep-82 11:44    Scott E  Fahlman             :-)
From: Scott E  Fahlman <Fahlman at Cmu-20c>

I propose that the following character sequence for joke markers:

:-)

Read it sideways.  Actually, it is probably more economical to mark
things that are NOT jokes, given current trends.  For this, use

:-(

References

External links
 

1948 births
Living people
American computer scientists
Artificial intelligence researchers
Fellows of the Association for the Advancement of Artificial Intelligence
Carnegie Mellon University faculty
MIT School of Engineering alumni
Lisp (programming language) people
People from Medina, Ohio
Natural language processing researchers
Machine learning researchers
Creators of writing systems